Acrocercops coloptila is a moth of the family Gracillariidae. It is known from Uganda.

The larvae feed on Annona squamosa. They probably mine the leaves of their host plant.

References

Endemic fauna of Uganda
coloptila
Moths of Africa
Moths described in 1937
Insects of Uganda